Juuso Kangaskorpi (born 1975) is a Finnish football defender and manager who currently is player-manager of for the Ykkönen side Mikkelin Palloilijat. Kangaskorpi was a long-time captain of FC Haka in Veikkausliiga and coached the clubs A-juniors in 2008 before returning to his hometown club. He won the Finnish Cup with his side FC Haka in 2002 and 2005.

He has six caps for the Finland national football team.

External links
Guardian's Stats Centre

Finnish footballers
FC Haka players
Veikkausliiga players
1975 births
Living people
Association football defenders
Finland international footballers
People from Mikkeli
Sportspeople from South Savo